Parliamentary elections were held in Colombia on 13 March 1994 to elect the Senate and Chamber of Representatives. The result was a victory for the Liberal Party, which won 88 of the 163 seats in the Chamber and 56 of the 102 seats in the Senate.

Results

Senate

Chamber of Representatives

References

Parliamentary elections in Colombia
Colombia
1994 in Colombia
Election and referendum articles with incomplete results